Chaman Nahal commonly known as C Nahal, also known as Chaman Nahal Azadi, was an Indian born writer of English literature. He was widely considered one of the best exponents of Indian writing in English and is known for his work, Azadi, which is set on India's Independence and her partition. He is also known for his depiction of Mahatma Gandhi as a complex character with human failings.

Life and career
Chaman Nahal was born in Sialkot, in pre-Independence India, a province in the present day Pakistan, in 1927. After having his school education locally, he did his master's in English at University of Delhi in 1948. He continued his education as a British Council Scholar at University of Nottingham (1959–61) and obtained a PhD in English in 1961.
During his education, he worked as a lecturer (1949–1962). In 1962, he joined Rajasthan University, Jaipur as reader in English. The next year, he moved to New Delhi as professor of English at the University of New Delhi.
He was a Fulbright fellow at Princeton University, New Jersey and served as a visiting professor at various universities in the United States, Malaysia, Japan, Singapore, Canada and North Korea. He was also a fellow at Cambridge College in 1991 and worked as columnist for the Indian Express, writing a column talking about books from 1966 to 1973. He died on 29 November 2013 in New Delhi, India.

List of works
Novels

Short story collection

Uncollected short stories

Others

Bibliography

In The New Literatures in English, 1985

Critical Studies on Chaman Nahal

Memoir

Children's novels

Literary review
Chaman Nahal's writings are known to talk about India without any touch of exoticism. Azadi, his novel on the partition of India, is widely considered to be the best of the Indian-English novels written about the traumatic partition which accompanied Indian Independence in 1947 (Quoted from '’Train to Pakistan – Azadi : Vice-versa Journey'’ by Dr. Mangalkumar R. Patil). An autobiographical book, Silent Life, was originally written in English and later translated into 12 languages, including Russian, Hungarian and Sinhalese.

Awards and honours

References

1927 births
Indian male novelists
Indian male short story writers
English-language writers from India
Recipients of the Sahitya Akademi Award in English
2013 deaths
20th-century Indian novelists
20th-century Indian short story writers
People from Sialkot District
20th-century Indian male writers